[[Image:RDN LCP2 SRC90E.jpg|thumb|right|SB90E marked LCP2 in its hoist aboard HDMS Absalon]]

The Storebro SB90E is a small craft developed by Swedish yacht designer Storebro Bruks AB. It was initially developed for the Swedish Navy, who designated it the Stridsbåt 90 E, the E being for Enkel (Swedish for single) - shortened to Strb 90 E. It was later rebranded as the Storebro SRC90E for international military export and it is now exclusively sold as SB90E for the civilian market. Their classification is YH, for ambulance boat.

History

The SB90E was originally intended to be used as a medical evacuation vessel and simple insertion craft for the Swedish Amphibious Corps, with 60 ordered and 54 delivered; today only 5 remain in Swedish military service, with the rest being scrapped, sold off or in the case of 7 vessels, donated to the civilian Swedish Sea Rescue Society'' (Svenska Sjöräddningssällskapet). In most cases the duties intended for the Strb 90 E have been taken over by the Strb 90 H.

Operators
 Sweden
 Norway
 Lithuania
 China
 The Royal Danish Navy operates the SB90E in two variants:
 4 x LCP-vessels used aboard the Absalon class command ship, modified with a weapons-station
 2 x SAR-vessels used aboard the Knud Rasmussen class patrol vessel, modified with ice-reinforcement and upgraded engines

Specifications
 Length: 11.9 m
 Beam: 2.90 m
 Draft: 0.7 m
 Displacement: 7.2 t
 Range: Approx. 200 nm
 Max. speed: Approx. 42 knots

See also

 CB90-class fast assault craft

Notes

References

 Manufacturers page

Patrol boat classes
Auxiliary search and rescue ship classes
Auxiliary transport ship classes
Military boats